Sweden competed at the 2020 Summer Paralympics in Tokyo, Japan, which took place from 24 August to 5 September 2021. This was their sixteenth consecutive appearance at the Summer Paralympics since 1960. The Swedish team consisted of 26 athletes in 11 sports.

Medalists

Competitors
The following is the list of number of competitors participating in the Games.

Archery 

Sweden collected one quota place at the 2019 Para Archery World Championships held in Den Bosch, Netherlands.

|-
|align=left|Zandra Reppe
|align=left|Women's individual compound
|643
|24
|L 134–138
|colspan=4|Did not advance
|17
|}

Athletics 

Men's field

Per Jonsson was qualified and selected to compete in men's long jump T12, but was injured shortly before the games and was replaced by Olof Ryberg.

Women's field

Boccia

Canoeing

Cycling 
Sweden is scheduled to compete in cycling (male and female road events) at the 2020 Summer Paralympics.

Road

Track

Equestrian 
Sweden sent two athletes, Louise Etzner Jakobsson and Lena Malmström.

Judo

Shooting 

Sweden qualified for the 2020 Summer Paralympics after their results at the 2018 World Shooting Para Sport Championships and the 2019 World Shooting Para Sport World Cup.

The athletes that qualified for the 2020 Summer Paralympics are Bang Yu-jeong, Håkan Gustafsson, Philip Jönsson, Joackim Norberg and Anna Normann.

Legend: Q=Qualified; PR=Paralympic record

Swimming 

Two Swedish swimmer has successfully entered the paralympic slot after breaking the MQS.

Legend: Q=Qualified; ER=European record; NR=National record

Table tennis 

Sweden entered four athletes into the table tennis competition at the games. Anna-Carin Ahlquist & Ingela Lundbäck qualified from 2019 ITTF European Para Championships which was held in Helsingborg, Sweden and Alexander Öhgren & Emil Andersson via World Ranking allocation.

Men

Alexander Öhgren developed cold symptoms. While he tested negative for Covid-19 he was nevertheless forced to withdraw from the games.

Women

Wheelchair tennis

Sweden qualified one players entries for wheelchair tennis. Stefan Olsson qualified by the world rankings.

See also 
 Sweden at the Paralympics
 Sweden at the 2020 Summer Olympics

References

External links 
 2020 Summer Paralympics website

Nations at the 2020 Summer Paralympics
2020
Summer Paralympics